Shosei Go (Japanese: Go Shōsei; June 28, 1916 – June 7, 1987) was a two-way baseball player from Taiwan.

Go was a leadoff man who played for the Tokyo Giants (1937–1943, now the Yomiuri Giants), Hanshin Tigers (1944–1949) and Mainichi Orions (1950–1957, now the Chiba Lotte Marines). Only 5-foot-6 and 140 pounds, he was nicknamed "The Human Locomotive" due to his speed. As a left-handed outfielder, he won two batting titles and a stolen base title. 

As a pitcher, the bulk of his appearances were in 1946, when he went 14-6 with a 3.03 ERA and 16 complete games. Go also threw the first postwar no-hitter, against the Tokyo Senators in 1946.

See also
Japanese Baseball Hall of Fame
Sports in Taiwan

External links

Japanese Baseball Hall of Fame and Museum

1916 births
1987 deaths
Mainichi Orions players
Hanshin Tigers players
Japanese people of Taiwanese descent
Naturalized citizens of Japan
Baseball players from Kaohsiung
Taiwanese emigrants to Japan
Taiwanese expatriate baseball players in Japan
Japanese sportspeople of Chinese descent